Malicious Intent is the third album released in 1986 by Canadian speed/thrash metal band Razor. The album contains more honed and intense screaming from frontman Stace McLaren and the tracks on it mostly contains lyrics about heroic fantasy and playing heavy metal. An exception to this might be "Tear Me to Pieces", with lyrics penned by McLaren about knife fighting. Malicious Intent is known for containing incredibly loud drum rides and overall poor production. The album itself is an overall turning point for Razor and shows them going from traditional heavy metal and speeding up to a more thrash metal-oriented sound.

Track listing

Notes
 The first pressing 2002 CD re-issue by Attic Records has similar martix/runout, but with "CINRAM" as logotype. The 2nd pressing has "CINRAM" as no logotype in matrix/runout. They also contain a bonus track titled "Mosh", which begins with an unknown person playing the song "Jeepers Creepers" on the piano with Stace McLaren going on a swearing tirade, followed by a fast-paced measure played by the band throughout each session
 Re-issued in 2019 as a 12" limited edition colored vinyl by Hammerheart Records, limited to 1000 copies

Personnel

Musicians
Stace McLaren – vocals
Dave Carlo – guitars
Mike Campagnolo – bass
Mike Embro – drums

Production
Terry Marostega – engineering
Garnet Giesbrecht – art direction, design
Walter Zwol – producer
Robert Matichak – remastering
Lindsay Lozon – photography

References

1986 albums
Razor (band) albums